The KrAZ H12.2 truck is manufactured at the KrAZ plant in Ukraine.  It was first presented in the 2011 year. 

KrAZ H12.2 is provided engine YaMZ-536 rated at 312 hp, the MFZ-430 clutch and the 9JS150ТА mechanical transmission.

Technical characteristics 
Engine: YaMZ-536 6.65 L diesel 6 cyl. (Euro IV)
Power: 312 PS (229 kW)
Torque: 1230 Nm
Transmission: mechanical 9JS150ТА
Clutch: single disk MFZ-430
Axle configuration: 4x2
Payload: 13.500 kg

KrAZ vehicles
Cars of Ukraine